The 1976 Basildon District Council election took place on 6 May 1976 to elect members of Basildon District Council in Essex, England. This was on the same day as other local elections. The Labour Party lost overall control of the council, which fell under no overall control.

Overall results

|-
| colspan=2 style="text-align: right; margin-right: 1em" | Total
| style="text-align: right;" | 46
| colspan=5 |
| style="text-align: right;" | 38,107
| style="text-align: right;" |

Ward results

Barstable (3 seats)

Billericay (3 seats)

Burstead (3 seats)

Buttsbury (3 seats)

Castleton (4 seats)

Central (3 seats)

Fryerns East (3 seats)

Fryerns West (3 seats)

Laindon (4 seats)

Langdon Hills (3 seats)

Lee Chapel North (3 seats)

Pitsea (3 seats)

Vange (4 seats)

Wickford (4 seats)

References

1976
1976 English local elections
1970s in Essex